

Scotland
 Seton Airlie – Cannes – 1947–48
 William John Aitken – Cannes, Antibes – 1932–34, 1937–39
 Robert Allison – RC Roubaix – 1936–39
 John Baker Muir – Excelsior Roubaix – 1933–35
 Eric Black – Metz – 1986–91
 John Blane – Cannes – 1947–48
 Alec Cheyne – SC Nîmes – 1932–34
 John Collins – AS Monaco – 1996–98
 Siriki Dembélé – Auxerre – 2022–
 John Donoghue – Excelsior Roubaix – 1932–35
 Peter Dougall – Sète – 1932–33
 Willie Dowall – Red Star – 1937–38
 Thomas Dunsmore – Sète – 1946–47
 Edward Edmunds – Red Star – 1932–33
 Steven Fletcher – Marseille – 2015–16
 Jamie Fullarton – Bastia – 1996–97
 Fraser Hornby – Reims – 2020–
 Allan Hutton – Cannes – 1947–48
 Allan Johnston – Rennes – 1996–97
 Mo Johnston – Nantes – 1987–89
 James Keenan – Red Star – 1937–38
 Jeremiah Kelly – Rennes – 1933–34
 John MacGowan – Olympique Lillois – 1932–34
 Malcom MacLaren – Cannes – 1947–48
 Alexander MacLennan – Excelsior Roubaix – 1934–37
 Phillip McCloy – Rennes – 1933–34
 Derek McInnes – Toulouse – 1999–2000
 George Mills – Cannes – 1933–34
 Bill Murray – RC Roubaix – 1937–38
 George Nicol – RC Roubaix – 1935–37
 Denis O'Hare – CA Paris – 1932–34
 Harold O'Neill – Red Star – 1935–36
 Thomas Francis Pritchard – Marseille – 1932–33
 John Renwick – Excelsior Roubaix – 1935–36
 Alexander Patterson Sherry – Marseille – 1932–33
 Gary Smith – Rennes – 1996–97
 George Alexander Smoker – Alès – 1932–33, 1934–36
 Ray Stephen – AS Nancy – 1986–87, 1990–91
 Ian Wallace – Brest – 1984–85
 Andrew Wilson – SC Nîmes – 1932–34

Senegal

B
 Abasse Ba – Le Havre – 2008–09
 Issa Ba – Auxerre – 2006–09
 Khalifa Ba – Marseille – 2003–04
 Youssouph Badji – Brest – 2021–22
 Keita Baldé – Monaco – 2017–18, 2019–20
 Fodé Ballo-Touré – Lille, Monaco – 2017–21
 Rahmane Barry – Marseille, Lorient – 2003–05, 2006–07
 Moustapha Bayal Sall – Saint-Étienne, Nancy – 2006–16
 Habib Beye – Strasbourg, Marseille – 1998–2001, 2002–07
 Jules Bocandé – Metz, Paris SG, Nice, Lens – 1984–92
 Sarr Boubacar – Marseille, Paris SG – 1975–76, 1977–83, 1984–86

C
 Alcaly Camara – Sedan – 2002–03
 François Camara – Nîmes Olympique – 1968–69
 Henri Camara – Sedan – 2001–03
 Souleymane Camara – Laval, Reims – 1975–79
 Souleymane Camara – AS Monaco, Guingamp, Nice, Montpellier – 2001–07, 2009–20
 Saliou Ciss – Valenciennes, Angers – 2013–14, 2017–18
 Adama Cissé – Lille OSC – 1994–95
 Aliou Cissé – Lille OSC, Paris SG, Montpellier, Sedan – 1994–95, 1999–2002, 2006–07
 Pape Abou Cissé – Saint-Étienne – 2020–21
 Papiss Cissé – Metz – 2007–08
 Ferdinand Coly – Châteauroux, Lens – 1997–98, 1999–2002
 Racine Coly – Nice – 2017–21
 Abdoulaye Coulibaly – Saint-Étienne – 2008–09

D
 Omar Daf – Sochaux, Brest – 1998–99, 2001–09, 2010–13
Boulaye Dia – Reims – 2018–21
 Issiar Dia – AS Nancy – 2006–10, 2016–17
Fallou Diagne – Rennes, Metz – 2014–18
 Modou Diagne – AS Nancy – 2016–17
Pape Diakhaté – AS Nancy, Saint-Étienne, Lyon – 2005–07, 2009–11
Abdou Diallo – Monaco, Paris SG – 2014–15, 2016–17, 2019–
 Abdoulaye Diallo – Marseille – 1984–90
 Abdoulaye Diallo – Rennes – 2009–10, 2011–12, 2015–16, 2017–19
Baïla Diallo – Clermont – 2022–
 Habib Diallo – Metz, Strasbourg – 2016–18, 2019–
 Lamana Diallo – Sochaux – 2013–14
 Mustapha Diallo – Guingamp, Nîmes – 2013–19
 Zakaria Diallo – Dijon, Lens – 2011–12, 2020–21
 Salif Diao – AS Monaco, Sedan – 1998–99, 2000–2002
 Krépin Diatta – Monaco – 2020–
 Lamine Diatta – Toulouse FC, Rennes, Lyon, Saint-Étienne – 1998–2007
 Elhadji Pape Diaw – Angers – 2018–19
Mory Diaw – Clermont – 2022–
 Djibril Diawara – Le Havre, AS Monaco – 1994–99
 Souleymane Diawara – Le Havre, Sochaux, Bordeaux, Marseille, Nice – 1998–2000, 2002–06, 2007–15
 Famara Diédhiou – Angers – 2016–17
 Bamba Dieng – Marseille, Lorient – 2020–
 El Hadji Dieye – Saint-Étienne – 2021–22
 Mohamed Diongue – Nîmes Olympique – 1969–70
 Alioune Diop – Nîmes Olympique – 1960–61
 Papa Bouba Diop – Lens – 2002–04
 Papa Malick Diop – Strasbourg, Lorient, Metz – 1999–2002, 2007–08
 Papakouli Diop – Rennes – 2006–07
 Pape Cheikh Diop – Lyon, Dijon – 2017–19, 2020–21
 Pape Seydou Diop – Lens – 1998–99
 El Hadji Diouf – Rennes, Lens – 1999–2002
 Assane Dioussé – Saint-Étienne – 2017–22
 Dino Djiba – Metz – 2003–06, 2007–08
 Papy Djilobodji – Nantes, Dijon, Guingamp – 2013–15, 2017–19
 Moussa Djitté – Ajaccio – 2022–
 Boukary Dramé – Paris SG, Sochaux – 2005–11

F
 Khalilou Fadiga – Auxerre – 2000–03
 Noah Fadiga – Brest – 2022–
 Pape Abdoulaye Fall – Marseille, Caen – 1987–90
 Jacques Faty – Rennes, Marseille, Sochaux – 2002–11
 Ricardo Faty – Strasbourg, Nantes, AC Ajaccio – 2005–06, 2008–09, 2012–14
 Abdoulaye Faye – Lens, Istres – 2002–05
 Amdy Faye – Auxerre – 1999–2003
 Ibrahima Faye – Caen, Troyes – 2004–07
 Mamadou Faye – Bastia – 1994–98
 Maodomalick Faye – Saint-Étienne – 2006–08, 2009–10
 Sérigné Faye – Montpellier – 2022–
 Joachim Fernandez – Bordeaux, Caen – 1995–97

G
 Lamine Gassama – Lyon, Lorient – 2008–16
 Alfred Gomis – Dijon, Rennes – 2019–22
 Rémi Gomis – Caen, Valenciennes, Nantes – 2007–16
 Bernus Goram – AS Nancy – 1980–82
 Abdoulaye Gueye – Sochaux, Brest – 1977–80, 1981–83
 Babacar Gueye – Metz – 2003–06, 2007–08
 Babacar Guèye – Troyes – 2015–16
 Cheikh Gueye – Metz – 2007–08
 Idrissa Gueye – Lille, Paris SG – 2010–15, 2019–22
 Lamine Gueye – Metz – 2020–22
 Makhtar Gueye – Saint-Étienne – 2018–19
 Moussa Gueye – Metz – 2014–15
 Pape Gueye – Marseille – 2020–

J
 Ismail Jakobs – Monaco – 2021–

K
 Bingourou Kamara – Strasbourg, Montpellier – 2017–18, 2020–
 Mamadou Kambell-Seck – Strasbourg – 1988–89
 Mamadou Kane – Lille OSC – 1991–92
 Racine Amadou Kane – Metz, Brest – 1987–88, 1989–90
 Kara – Nantes – 2018–19
 Abdoulaye Khouma Keita – AS Nancy – 2005–07
 Moussa Konaté – Amiens, Dijon – 2017–21
 Moussa Koné – Nîmes – 2019–21

L
Alboury Lah – Paris SG – 1990–91
Dion Lopy – Reims – 2020–
Joseph Lopy – Sochaux – 2011–14

M
Cheikh M'Bengue – Toulouse, Rennes, Saint-Étienne – 2007–19
David Papys M'Bodji – Marseille, Lorient – 2002–03, 2006–07
Pape M'Bow – Marseille – 2007–08, 2009–10
Abdou Kader Mangane – Lens, Rennes, Gazélec Ajaccio, Strasbourg – 2007–12, 2015–16, 2017–18
Boubacar Mansaly – Saint-Étienne – 2009–10
Adama Mbengue – Caen – 2017–19
Amadou Salif Mbengue – Metz – 2021–22
 Moustapha Mbow – Reims – 2021–
 Arial Mendy – Clermont – 2021–23
Edouard Mendy – Reims, Rennes – 2018–21
Frédéric Mendy – Saint-Étienne – 2004–06
Nampalys Mendy – Monaco, Nice – 2010–11, 2013–16, 2007–18
Roger Mendy – Toulon, AS Monaco – 1985–92

N
 Guirane N'Daw – Sochaux, Nantes, Saint-Étienne, Metz – 2002–11, 2014–15
 Alfred N'Diaye – Nancy – 2008–11
 Cheick N'Diaye – Rennes – 2008–09
 Deme N'Diaye – Arles-Avignon, Lens – 2010–11, 2014–15
 Ismaïla N'Diaye – Caen – 2008–09, 2010–11
 Lamine N'Diaye – Mulhouse – 1989–90
 Leyti N'Diaye – Marseille, AC Ajaccio – 2004–05, 2007–08, 2010–13
 Makhtar N'Diaye – Rennes – 1999-03
 Mamadou N'Diaye – Montpellier – 2014–17
 Mame N'Diaye – Marseille, Boulogne – 2005–06, 2009–10
 Momar N'Diaye – Metz – 2004–06, 2007–08
 Moussa N'Diaye – AS Monaco, Sedan, Istres, Ajaccio, Auxerre – 1998–03, 2004–07
 Samba N'Diaye – Lille, Metz, Nantes – 1992–96, 1997–98
 Sylvain N'Diaye – Bordeaux, Lille OSC, Marseille – 1996–97, 2000–05
 Cheikh N'Doye – Angers – 2015–17, 2018–19
 Mayoro N'Doye – Metz – 2014–15
 Ousmane N'Doye – Toulouse FC – 2003–04
 Saar N'Gor – Laval – 1988–89
 Pape Ndiaga Yade – Metz, Troyes – 2019–
 Abdallah Ndour – Strasbourg – 2017–20
 Santy Ngom – Nantes – 2017–18
 Opa Nguette – Valenciennes, Metz – 2012–14, 2016–18, 2019–22
 Ibrahima Niane – Metz, Angers – 2017–18, 2019–
M'Baye Niang – Caen, Montpellier, Rennes, Bordeaux, Auxerre – 2010–12, 2013–14, 2018–
 Mamadou Niang – Troyes, Metz, Strasbourg, Marseille – 2000–11
 Cheikh Niasse – Lille – 2019–20, 2021–22

P
 Ferdinand Pordie – Rennes, Troyes – 1946–49, 1954–55
 Oumar Pouye – Metz – 2007–08

S
Cheikh Sabaly – Metz – 2020–22
Youssouf Sabaly – Evian, Nantes, Bordeaux – 2013–21
Jean-Christophe Sagna – Laval – 1977–82
Lamine Sagna – Bordeaux – 1990–91
Henri Saivet – Bordeaux, Saint-Étienne – 2007–17
Diafra Sakho – Rennes – 2017–19
Lamine Sakho – Lens, Marseille, Saint-Étienne – 1999–2003, 2004–06
Massamba Sambou – AS Monaco, Le Havre – 2006–09
Oumar Sané – Le Havre, Metz – 1998–99, 2001–02
Pape Sané – Caen – 2016–17
Salif Sané – Bordeaux, AS Nancy – 2010–13
Younousse Sankharé – Paris SG, Djon, Valenciennes, Guingamp, Lille, Bordeaux – 2007–10, 2011–19
Bouna Sarr – Metz, Marseille – 2014–21
Ismaïla Sarr – Metz, Rennes – 2016–19
Kordoba Sarr – Caen – 2004–05
Mouhamadou-Naby Sarr – Lyon – 2013–14
Pape Sarr – Saint-Étienne, Lens – 1999–2004
Pape Matar Sarr – Metz – 2020–22
Sidy Sarr – Nîmes – 2019–21
 Malik Seck – Lens – 2014–15
 Mamadou Seck – Ajaccio – 2002–05
 Badara Sène – Sochaux, Le Mans – 2005–08, 2009–10
 Oumar Sène – Laval, Paris SG – 1981–92
 Moussa Seydi – Metz – 2016–17
 Abdallah Sima – Angers – 2022–
 Sambou Soumano – Lorient – 2021–
 Ansou Sow – Lens – 2020–21
 Moussa Sow – Rennes, Lille OSC – 2004–12
 Pape Habib Sow – Sochaux – 2005–06
 Seydou Sy – Monaco – 2016–19
 Tony Sylva – Monaco, Lille – 1999–2008

T
Hamadin Tall – RC Paris – 1961–62
Ibrahim Tall – Sochaux, Nantes – 2002–05, 2008–09
Pape Thiaw – Metz – 2003–04
Sada Thioub – Nice, Nîmes, Angers, Saint-Étienne – 2014–15, 2018–22
Demba Touré – Lyon – 2002–03
Zargo Touré – Boulogne – 2009–10
Amara Traoré – Gueugnon, Metz, Châteauroux – 1995–99

W
 Amadou Wade – Stade Français – 1959–62
 Omar Wade – Lille OSC – 2010–11
 Moussa Wagué – Nice – 2019–20

Y
 Thierno Youm – Laval, Nantes – 1984–92

Serbia
 Branislav Aćimović – Sète – 1935–36
 Rajko Aleksić – Lyon – 1977–79
 Veljko Aleksić – AS Angoulême – 1969–70
 Komnen Andrić – Clermont – 2022–
 Slobodan Antić – Nancy – 1979–80
 Aleksandar Aranđelović – RC Paris – 1951–52
 Stefan Babović – Nantes – 2008–09
 Mane Bajić – Lille OSC – 1971–72
 Bojan Banjac – Lille OSC – 1996–97
 Veljko Birmančević – Toulouse FC – 2022–
Milan Biševac – Lens, Valenciennes, Paris SG, Lyon, Metz – 2006–18
 Nenad Bjeković – Nice – 1976–81
 Nenad Bjeković – Nantes, Châteauroux – 1996–98
 Zdravko Borovnica – Bastia – 1982–83
 Miroslav Bošković – Angers – 1976–77
 Miloš Bursać – Toulon, Lyon – 1989–92
 Ivan Ćurković – Saint-Étienne – 1972–81
 Dragan Cvetković – Bastia – 1984–85
 Zoran Dakić – Reims, AC Ajaccio – 1970–72
 Milan Damjanović – Angers – 1971–75, 1976–77
 Miloš Ðelmaš – Nice – 1987–91
 Miloš Dimitrijević – Nantes, Grenoble – 2004–07, 2008–09
 Filip Đorđević – Nantes – 2008–09, 2013–14
 Slađan Đukić – Troyes – 1999–2001
 Vladimir Durković – Saint-Étienne – 1967–71
 Dragan Džajić – Bastia – 1975–77
Nenad Džodić – Montpellier, Ajaccio – 1997–2006, 2009–10
Milan Gajić – Bordeaux – 2015–19
 Milan Galić – Reims – 1970–73
 Svetislav Glišović – Stade Français – 1946–47
 Nenad Grozdić – Lens – 2000–01
 Dragan Gugleta – Strasbourg – 1967–69
 Ivan Gvozdenović – Metz – 2004–05
 Dejan Ilić – Istres – 2004–05
 Zvonko Ivezić – Sochaux – 1976–82
 Slobodan Janković – Lens – 1975–77
 Nenad Jestrović – Bastia, Metz – 1997–2000
 Vukašin Jovanović – Bordeaux – 2016–20
 Zoran Jovičić – Caen – 2004–05
 Vladimir Jugović – AS Monaco – 2001–02
 Stanislav Karasi – Lille OSC – 1974–77
 Mateja Kežman – Paris SG – 2008–11
 Branislav Kostić – Laval – 1976–77
 Nenad Kovačević – Lens – 2006–08, 2009–11
 Vladica Kovačević – Nantes – 1966–67
 Miloš Krasić – Bastia – 2013–14
 Petar Krivokuća – Rouen – 1977–78
 Dobrosav Krstić – Sochaux – 1964–66
 Nebojša Krupniković – Bastia – 1999
 Branko Lazarević – Caen – 2010–11
 Danijel Ljuboja – Sochaux, Strasbourg, Paris SG, Grenoble, Nice – 1998–99, 2000–01, 2002–05, 2009–11
 Ilija Lukić – Rennes – 1969–71
 Vladan Lukić – Metz – 1997–99
 Milan Martinović – Ajaccio – 2003–04
 Igor Matić – Caen – 2004–05
 Stjepan Matić – Rennes – 1976–77
 Vojislav Melić – Sochaux – 1967–74
 Ljubomir Mihajlović – Lyon – 1970–77
 Zoran Milinković – Nice – 1996–97
 Goran Milojević – Brest – 1990–91
 Slobodan Milosavljević – Valenciennes – 1970–71, 1972–73
 Selemir Milošević – Red Star – 1968–71
 Dejan Milovanović – Lens – 2009–10
 Bora Milutinović – Monaco, Nice – 1967–69, 1970–71
 Miloš Milutinović – RC Paris, Stade Français – 1961–65
 Dalibor Mitrović – Ajaccio – 2003–04
 Milorad Mitrović – Sète – 1933–34
 Stefan Mitrović – Strasbourg – 2018–21
 Slavoljub Muslin – Lille, Brest – 1981–86
 Velimir Naumović – Rennes – 1969–71
 Predrag Ocokoljić – Toulouse FC – 2003–05
 Žarko Olarević – Lille – 1978–81
 Goran Pandurović – Rennes – 1995–98
 Dragan Pantelić – Bordeaux – 1981–83
 Ilija Pantelić – Marseille, Bastia, Paris SG – 1970–77
 Marko Pantelić – Paris SG – 1996–97
 Milinko Pantić – Le Havre – 1998–99
 Strahinja Pavlović – Monaco – 2020–21
 Nemanja Pejčinović – Nice – 2010–14
 Aleksandar Pešić – Toulouse – 2014–16
 Ilija Petković – Troyes – 1973–76
 Denis Petrić – Troyes, Angers, Nantes – 2015–17, 2019–20
 Ognjen Petrović – Bastia – 1976–78
 Vladimir Petrović "Pižon" – Brest – 1985–86
 Josip Pirmajer – Nîmes Olympique – 1972–75
 Nemanja Radonjić – Marseille – 2018–22
 Aleksandar Radovanović – Lens – 2020–21
 Milan Radović – Brest – 1981–84
 Ljubiša Rajković – Bastia – 1979–81
 Predrag Rajković – Reims – 2019–22
 Zevan Rakić – Bastia – 1970–71
 Ljubiša Ranković – Caen – 2004–05
 Zoran Rendulić – Grenoble – 2008–10
 Mihailo Ristić – Montpellier – 2018–22
 Spasoje Samardžic – Saint-Étienne – 1969–72
 Dušan Savić – Lille, Cannes – 1983–85, 1987–89
 Vujadin Savić – Bordeaux – 2010–11
 Stevan Sekereš – Nantes – 1967–68
 Laslo Seleš – Sochaux – 1969–78
 Milovan Sikimić – Guingamp – 2002–04
 Slobodan Škrbić – Lille,  – 1971–72
 Petar Škuletić – Montpellier – 2018–21
 Živko Slijepčević – Valenciennes – 1992–93
 Uroš Spajić – Toulouse FC – 2013–16
 Zlatko Spleit – Nîmes Olympique – 1960–61
 Jovan Stanković – Marseille – 2000–01
 Ivan Stevanović – Sochaux – 2009–10
 Ljubiša Stevanović – SC Nîmes – 1932–33
 Dragan Stojković – Marseille – 1990–94
 Nenad Stojković – Monaco, Montpellier, AS Nancy – 1984–86, 1987–88, 1990–91
 Vladimir Stojković – Nantes – 2006–07
 Neven Subotić – Saint-Étienne – 2017–19
 Silvester Takač – Rennes – 1967–69
 Ðorđe Tomić – Guingamp – 1995–96
 Slobodan Topalović – Lyon – 1981–83
 Duško Tošić – Sochaux – 2005–07
 Dobrivoje Trivić – Lyon – 1971–73
 Bogdan Turudija – Troyes – 1976–78
 Dušan Veškovac – Toulouse, Troyes – 2013–17
 Milivoje Vitakić – Lille, Grenoble – 2004–07, 2008–10
 Nebojša Vučićević – Metz – 1989–90
 Ivan Vukomanović – Bordeaux – 1998–99
 Momčilo Vukotić – Bordeaux – 1978–79
 Miodrag Živaljević – Lyon – 1979–80
 Nebojša Zlatarić – Marseille, Paris FC, Valenciennes – 1975–77, 1978–79, 1980–81

Sierra Leone
 Mohamed Kallon – AS Monaco – 2004–05, 2006–08

Slovakia
 János Chawko – Metz – 1951–52
 Ferdinand Faczinek – Sochaux – 1937–39
 Miloš Glonek – Caen – 1994–95, 1996–97
 Tomáš Hubočan – Marseille  – 2016–17
 Viliam Hýravý – Toulouse FC – 1991–92
 Milan Luhový – Saint-Étienne – 1992–93
 Ľubomír Moravčík – Saint-Étienne, Bastia – 1990–98
 Szilárd Németh – Strasbourg – 2005–06
 Carlo Pintér – Mulhouse – 1936–37
 Ján Popluhár – Lyon – 1968–70
 Adolf Scherer – Nîmes Olympique – 1969–72
 Filip Šebo – Valenciennes – 2007–10
 Dušan Tittel – Nîmes Olympique – 1991–93
 Alexander Vencel Jr. – Strasbourg, Le Havre – 1994–2000, 2002–03
 Róbert Vittek – Lille – 2008–10

Slovenia
 Milenko Acimovic – Lille – 2004–06
 Vili Ameršek – Angers – 1976–79
 Robert Berić – Saint-Étienne – 2015–20
 Valter Birsa – Sochaux, Auxerre – 2006–09, 2008–11
 Miha Blažič – Angers – 2022–
 Boštjan Cesar – Marseille, Grenoble – 2005–07, 2008–10
 Marko Elsner – Nice – 1987–90
 Adriano Fegic – AS Nancy – 1985–86
 Bojan Jokic – Sochaux – 2007–10
 Ažbe Jug – Bordeaux – 2013–15
 Rene Krhin – Nantes – 2017–20
 Tony Kurbos – Metz, Nice, AS Monaco – 1982–85, 1987–88, 1989
 Džoni Novak – Le Havre, Sedan – 1996–2000
 Milan Osterc – Le Havre – 2003
 Jan Repas – Caen – 2017–19
 Ermin Šiljak – Bastia – 1996–97
 Vinko Trskan – Marseille – 1947–48
 Luka Žinko – Istres – 2004–05

South Africa
Keagan Dolly – Montpellier – 2016–21
Kermit Erasmus – Rennes – 2015–17
Lyle Foster – Monaco – 2019–20
Pierre Issa – Marseille – 1996–2000
Thabang Molefe – Le Mans – 2003–04
Lebo Mothiba – Lille, Strasbourg, Troyes – 2017–20, 2021–
Katlego Mphela – Strasbourg – 2003–05
Anele Ngcongca – Troyes – 2015–16
Lebogang Phiri – Guingamp – 2017–19
Bongani Zungu – Amiens – 2017–20

South Korea
 Ahn Jung-hwan – Metz – 2005–06
 Hwang Ui-jo – Bordeaux – 2019–22
 Jung Jo-gook – Auxerre, AS Nancy – 2011–12
 Kang Jin-wook – Metz – 2005–06
 Kwon Chang-hoon – Dijon – 2016–19
 Lee Sang-yoon – Lorient – 1998–99
 Nam Tae-hee – Valenciennes – 2008–11
 Ou Kyoung-jun – Metz – 2007–08
 Park Chu-young – AS Monaco – 2008–11
 Seo Jung-won – Strasbourg – 1998–99
 Suk Hyun-jun – Troyes, Reims – 2017–20, 2021–22
 Yun Il-lok – Montpellier – 2019–21

Spain
 Álvaro – Marseille – 2019–22
 Antonio Abenoza – Reims – 1947–52
 José Arana Gorrostegui – Excelsior Roubaix – 1938–39
 Mikel Arteta – Paris SG – 2000–02
 Salvador Artigas – Rennes – 1945–49, 1952–53
 César Azpilicueta – Marseille – 2010–12
 Antonio Ballesteros – Angers – 1962–63
 Domènec Balmanya – Sète – 1937–39
 José Javier Barkero – Toulouse FC – 2000–01
 Yuri Berchiche – Paris SG – 2017–18
 Juan Bernat – Paris SG – 2018–
 Rubén Blanco – Marseille – 2022–
Oriol Busquets – Clermont – 2021–22
 Mario Cabanes Sabat – Metz – 1937–38
 José Caeiro – Rennes – 1956–57
 Francisco José Carrasco – Sochaux – 1989–92
 Albert Celades – Bordeaux – 2003–04
 Pedro Chirivella – Nantes – 2020–
 Esteban Cifuentes – Strasbourg – 1937–38
 Marc Crosas – Lyon – 2007–08
 Diego Cuenca – Sedan – 1955–57
 Sergi Darder – Lyon – 2015–17
 Heliodoro Delgado – Toulouse FC (1937), RC Paris, Metz – 1946–53
 Iván de la Peña – Marseille – 1999-00
 Enrique de Lucas – Paris SG – 2000–01
 Patrico Equizadu – Rennes – 1952–53
 Josep Escolà – Sète – 1937–39
 Francesc Fàbregas – Monaco – 2018–22
 Jesus Fandino – Metz – 1972–73
 Christian Fernandez – Marseille – 1977–78
 Lorenzo Fernández – Nîmes Olympique – 1954–55
 Alfonso Fernandez-Léal – Lyon – 1991–93
 José Manuel Galdames – Toulouse FC – 1997–99
 Antonio García – Le Havre, Lille – 1945–48
 Lazare Garcia – Sète – 1947–48
Manu García – Toulouse FC – 2018–19
 Javier Garrido – Saint-Étienne – 2004–05
 Esteban Gómez – Strasbourg, Toulouse FC (1937), Rennes – 1945–47 and 1948–51
 Juan José González Tacoronte – FC Nancy – 1953–54
 Ander Herrera – Paris SG – 2019–22
 Francisco Iriondo Orozco – Sète – 1935–36
 Jesé – Paris SG – 2016–17, 2019–21
Pol Lirola – Marseille – 2020–
 Borja López – Monaco – 2013–14
 Cristian López – Angers – 2018–19
 Gerard López – Monaco – 2005–07
Pau López – Marseille – 2021–
 Koke – Marseille – 2003–05
 José Mandaluniz Ealo – Stade Français – 1946–47
 Javier Manquillo – Marseille – 2015–16
 Valentin Martín – Stade Français – 1950–52
 Rafael Martín Vázquez – Marseille – 1992
 Paco Mateo – Strasbourg – 1945–50
 Jordi Mboula – Monaco – 2017–19
 Alfredo Megido – Bordeaux – 1977–78
 Álvaro Mejía – Arles-Avignon – 2010–11
 José Luis Molinuevo – RC Paris – 1945–47
 Fernando Morientes – AS Monaco, Marseille – 2003–04, 2009–10
 Francisco Navarro – Bordeaux – 1962–66
 Justo Nuevo – Red Star, Lille OSC, Le Havre, Rennes – 1945–53
 Luis Osoro – Montpellier – 1947–48
 José Padrón Martín – Alès, Cannes, Sochaux – 1935–38
 Sinforiano José Padrón Martín – FC Nancy – 1953–54
Sergi Palencia – Bordeaux, Saint-Étienne – 2018–20
 Rubén Pardo – Bordeaux – 2019–22
 Cristóbal Parralo – Paris SG – 2001–03
 Secundo Pascual – Strasbourg, Stade Français – 1945–51
Francisco Pavón – Arles-Avignon – 2010–11
 Ignacio Pavon – Marseille – 1962–63
 Alfonso Pérez – Marseille – 2001–02
 Manuel Pérez – Alès – 1947–48
 Iván Pérez Muñoz – Bordeaux – 1998–99
 Josep Raich Garriga – Sète – 1937–38
 Sergio Ramos – Paris SG – 2021–
 Luis Regueiro – RC Paris – 1937–38
 Sergio Rico – Paris SG – 2019–
 Albert Riera – Bordeaux – 2003–05
 Alberto Rivera Pizarro – Marseille – 2001–02
 Fabián Ruiz – Paris SG – 2022–
 Emilio Salaber – Nîmes Olympique, Sedan, Strasbourg – 1956–65, 1966–69
 José Sanchez – Sochaux – 1965–71
 Pablo Sarabia – Paris SG – 2019–23
 Angel Segurola – Bordeaux – 1962–63
 Jaime Solas – Lyon – 1959–61
 Carlos Soler – Paris SG – 2022–
 Daniel Solsona – Bastia – 1983–86
Brandon Thomas – Rennes – 2017–18
 Víctor Torres Mestre – Bordeaux – 1998–2000
 Santiago Urtizberea – Bordeaux – 1945–47
 Miguel Valls – Ajaccio – 1970–71
 Julian Vaquero – Toulouse FC (1937) – 1950–51
 Juan Vila – Marseille, SO Montpellier – 1945–48
 Ramón Zabalo – RC Paris – 1937–39

Sweden
 Gunnar Andersson – Marseille, Bordeaux – 1950–58, 1959–60
 Kennet Andersson – Lille, Caen – 1993–95
 Pär Bengtsson – Nice – 1950–52
 Pierre Bengtsson – Bastia – 2016–17
 Henrik Bertilsson – Martigues – 1994–96
 Yngve Brodd – Toulouse FC (1937), Sochaux – 1953–62
 Jens Cajuste – Reims – 2021–
 Henry Carlsson – RC Paris – 1948–49
 Mikael Dorsin – Strasbourg – 2003–04
 Jimmy Durmaz – Toulouse – 2016–19
 Erik Edman – Rennes – 2005–08
 Ralf Edström – AS Monaco – 1981–83
 Ove Eklund – Reims – 1974–75
 Dan Ekner – Marseille – 1950–51
 Johnny Ekström – Cannes – 1989–91
Niclas Eliasson – Nîmes – 2020–21
 Johan Elmander – Toulouse FC – 2006–08
 Lars Eriksson – Sète, Toulouse FC (1937) – 1953–55
 Leif Eriksson – Nice – 1970–75
 Alexander Farnerud – Strasbourg – 2003–06
 Pontus Farnerud – AS Monaco, Strasbourg – 1998–2006
 Amar Fatah – Troyes – 2022–
 Gabriel Gudmundsson – Lille – 2021–
 Petter Hansson – Rennes, AS Monaco – 2007–11
 Åke Hjalmarsson – Nice, Lyon, Troyes – 1950–51, 1952–53, 1954–56
 Niklas Hult – Nice – 2014–16
 Zlatan Ibrahimović – Paris SG – 2012–16
 Klas Ingesson – Marseille – 2000–01
 Andreas Isaksson – Rennes – 2004–06
 Gunnar Johansson – Marseille – 1950–58
Jakob Johansson – Rennes – 2018–19
 Egon Johnsson – Stade Français, Lens, Toulon – 1950–51, 1952–57, 1959–60
 Jon Jönsson – Toulouse FC – 2007–08
 Alexander Kačaniklić – Nantes – 2016–18
 Kim Källström – Rennes, Lyon – 2003–12
 Isaac Kiese Thelin – Bordeaux – 2015–17
 Emil Krafth – Amiens – 2018–19
Jack Lahne – Amiens – 2019–20
 Johan Larsson – Guingamp – 2018–19
 Anders Linderoth – Marseille – 1977–80
 Arne Lundqvist – Reims – 1953–55
Roger Magnusson – Marseille, Red Star – 1968–75
Bror Mellberg – Sochaux – 1956–57
Lasse Nilsson – Saint-Étienne – 2007–08
Stellan Nilsson – Marseille – 1953–54
Yksel Osmanovski – Bordeaux – 2001–02
Lennart Samuelsson – Nice – 1950–51
Amin Sarr – Lyon – 2022–
Karl Svensson – Caen – 2007–09
Michael Svensson – Troyes – 2001–02
Emra Tahirović – Lille – 2007–08
Ola Toivonen – Rennes, Toulouse FC – 2013–18
Christian Wilhelmsson – Nantes – 2006–07
Oliver Zandén – Toulouse FC – 2022–

Switzerland
 Almen Abdi – Le Mans – 2009–10
 André Abegglen – Sochaux – 1934–38
 Claude Andrey – Mulhouse – 1982–83
 Umberto Barberis – AS Monaco – 1980–83
 Pierre Beetschen – Lyon – 1956–60, 1961–64
Diego Benaglio – AS Monaco – 2017–19
Loris Benito – Bordeaux – 2019–21
 Kurt Bertsch – Saint-Étienne – 1946–47
 Ferdinand Bruhin – Marseille – 1933–42
 Arnaud Bühler – Sochaux – 2005–06
 Alexandre Bürger – Cannes, Toulouse FC (1937) – 1945–48
 Ricardo Cabanas – Guigamp – 2003–04
 Fabio Celestini – Troyes, Marseille – 2000–04
 Pierre-Albert Chapuisat – Paris FC – 1972–73
 Davide Chiumiento – Le Mans – 2005–06
 Alexandre Comisetti – Auxerre – 1999–2001
 Joël Corminbœuf – Strasbourg – 1993–94
 Michel Decastel – Strasbourg – 1979–81
 Breel Embolo – Monaco – 2022–
 Innocent Emeghara – Lorient – 2011–13
 Norbert Eschmann – Marseille, Stade Français – 1958–60, 1960–63
 Julián Estéban – Rennes – 2006–09
 Jacques Fatton – Lyon – 1954–57
 Lucien Favre – Toulouse FC – 1983–84
 Gelson Fernandes – Saint-Étienne, Rennes – 2009–10, 2014–17
 Alexander Frei – Rennes – 2002–05
 Michael Frey – Lille – 2014–15
 Alessandro Frigerio – Le Havre – 1938–39
 Philippe Fuchs – Saint-Étienne, Lyon OU – 1939, 1945–46
 Alain Geiger – Saint-Étienne – 1988–90
 Gaetano Giallanza – Nantes – 1997–98
 Dylan Gissi – Montpellier – 2014–15
 Albert Gougain – Sochaux, Red Star, Le Havre – 1933–39
 Marco Grassi – Rennes, AS Monaco, Cannes, Lyon – 1994–99
 Stéphane Grichting – Auxerre – 2002–12
 Daniel Gygax – Lille, Metz – 2005–06, 2007–08
 Bernt Haas – Bastia – 2004–05
 Alfred Jäck – Olympique Lillois – 1936–37
 Daniel Jeandupeux – Bordeaux – 1975–78
 Goran Karanović – Angers – 2015–16
 Edmond Kramer – SC Nîmes, Nice – 1932–34
 Dereck Kutesa – Reims – 2019–22
 Jean-Pierre La Placa – Toulouse FC – 1997–98
Léo Lacroix – Saint-Étienne – 2016–18
 Stephan Lichtsteiner – Lille OSC – 2005–08
 Johann Lonfat – Sochaux – 2002–06
 Jordan Lotomba – Nice – 2020–
 Badile Lubamba – Troyes – 2002–03
 Jean-Claude Milani – Nantes – 1988–90
 François Moubandje – Toulouse – 2013–19
 Patrick Müller – Lyon, Monaco – 2000–04, 2006–09
 Yvon Mvogo – Lorient – 2022–
 Dan Ndoye – Nice – 2020–22
 Christophe Ohrel – Rennes, Saint-Étienne – 1994–96
 Jonas Omlin – Montpellier – 2020–23
 Roger Pasquini – Saint-Étienne – 1938–39, 1946–47
 Raimondo Ponte – Bastia – 1981–82
 Philippe Pottier – Stade Français, Angers – 1961–67
 Anthony Racioppi – Dijon – 2020–21
 Joseph Rich – Saint-Étienne, FC Nancy – 1938–39, 1945–48
 Alain Rochat – Rennes – 2005–06
 Jean-Pierre Rochat – Alès – 1947–48
Vincent Rüfli – Dijon – 2016–18
Xherdan Shaqiri – Lyon – 2021–22
 Vincent Sierro – Toulouse – 2022–
 Kevin Spadanuda – Ajaccio – 2022–
 Jacques Spagnoli – Olympique Lillois – 1937–38
 Nestor Subiat – Mulhouse, Saint-Étienne – 1989–90, 1999–2000
 Jean Tamini – Saint-Étienne – 1950–52
 Sébastien Wüthrich – Montpellier – 2014–16

References and notes

Books

Club pages
AJ Auxerre former players
AJ Auxerre former players
Girondins de Bordeaux former players
Girondins de Bordeaux former players
Les ex-Tangos (joueurs), Stade Lavallois former players
Olympique Lyonnais former players
Olympique de Marseille former players
FC Metz former players
AS Monaco FC former players
Ils ont porté les couleurs de la Paillade... Montpellier HSC Former players
AS Nancy former players
FC Nantes former players
Paris SG former players
Red Star Former players
Red Star former players
Stade de Reims former players
Stade Rennais former players
CO Roubaix-Tourcoing former players
AS Saint-Étienne former players
Sporting Toulon Var former players

Others
stat2foot
footballenfrance
French Clubs' Players in European Cups 1955-1995, RSSSF
Finnish players abroad, RSSSF
Italian players abroad, RSSSF
Romanians who played in foreign championships
Swiss players in France, RSSSF
EURO 2008 CONNECTIONS: FRANCE, Stephen Byrne Bristol Rovers official site

References

Notes

France
 
Association football player non-biographical articles